Muhammad Afiq bin Azmi (born 5 January 1989) is a Malaysian footballer who last plays as a forward for Penang in the Malaysia Premier League. He previously plays for KSK Tambun Tulang, Kuala Lumpur and Kelantan. He also represented Perlis state in Sukma Games XV edition (year 2012) in Pahang.

Club career
Born in Kangar, Perlis, Afiq played two seasons for Kuala Lumpur and was the top scorer for his team. During his loan to Kelantan, he delivered outstanding performances in friendly matches before the 2012 Malaysia Cup campaign started. He scored a hat-trick and won 3–0 against Pattani and helped his team draw 1–1 against T-Team.

Afiq came in as a substitution against Terengganu replacing Badhri Radzi, but their team lost 0–2. On the second match, he scored 2 goals against Kedah. Afiq made his AFC Cup debut against Arbil. Afiq fail to score as Kelantan suffered a heavy defeat 5–1.

He had signed one-year contract with Selangor for 2013 Malaysia Super League. Later at the 2015 Malaysia Super League, he became the first local player to score a hat-trick in the 2015 Malaysia Super League and made the fastest hat-trick in the Malaysia Super League history which is within 15 minutes during a match against Singapore LionsXII on the 7th, 11th and 15th minute.

Honours

Club
Kelantan
 Malaysia Cup : 2012

Selangor
Malaysia Super League Runners-up: 2014
Malaysia Cup : 2015

References

External links
 Muhammad Afiq Azmi profile FASelangor.my

1989 births
Living people
Malaysian footballers
Kuala Lumpur City F.C. players
Negeri Sembilan FA players
Selangor FA players
People from Perlis
Association football forwards